Richard Fairgray (born 1985) is a New Zealand–born author and illustrator, working primarily in comics and children's books. He draws and colors and animates his work, in spite of being legally blind, with 3% vision in one eye and none in the other.

Career
Richard's works are best known in New Zealand and Australia where he has over 200 published titles. His comic series Blastosaurus (2008) became widely known in New Zealand when it was launched as the first locally produced monthly comic title. His picture books for children have been published all over the world by multiple publishers including Scholastic, Penguin/Random House and Sky Pony Press.

Richard was born in Auckland New Zealand and lived there until he was 31, with brief stints in Australia in his early 20s. His mother was a high school teacher. Richard learnt to read and write by the time he was 3 and immediately began making books in his spare time.

When Richard was seven he wrote his first comic book. Once again it featured a ghost being lonely and sad, but this time it was an original character – Ghost Ghost. Richard completed the book and had it photocopied at his school library, and sold at a school athletics day. Over the next decade Richard continued to produce comics, but rarely released any of them.

In 2001 Richard was part of the inaugural Class Comedians program as part of the NZ International Comedy Festival. Richard had never performed stand up before, but found his dry sense of humor and flat performance worked far better on stage than it did in person. He won one of the awards from the program and went on to perform stand up semi regularly through college, appearing occasionally on TV and being featured in a documentary focused on how terrible the quality of comedy had become in New Zealand.

It was through this that Richard was able to take his comic production to the next level, using his minor fame to get sponsorship and sell advertising in his books, allowing him to go suddenly from print runs of a few hundred to a few thousand. It was in 2002 that Richard first started selling his books at the Armageddon Expo.

Over the next 16 years Richard had booths at over 200 shows in New Zealand and Australia, as well as being a guest at San Diego Comic Con and the London Film and Comic Con in 2010 and 2012 respectively.

Richard graduated in 2007, with a Bachelor of Fine Arts from the Elam School of Fine Arts and a Post Graduate Diploma in Secondary Teaching from the University of Auckland, he took the summer to direct a self funded feature film.

In 2010 Richard was flown to San Diego Comic Con to launch Blastosaurus under the American Original imprint of Top Cow Comics, but the book was misprinted by the publisher. The mis-printed version was not released and Richard went home to relaunch the comic in New Zealand instead, through his company Square Planet Comics.

In 2012, Blastosaurus was relaunched in New Zealand, this time with Terry Jones contributing as a part time co-writer. The title quickly gained a much larger audience, selling well through bookstores, comic stores, to libraries and schools, as well as through conventions and online.

Over the next 5 years, Blastosaurus remained the highest selling New Zealand comic, selling thousands of copies of every volume, as well as convention specials, activity books, spinoff comic strips and even a toy. By the time Richard left New Zealand and shut down his publishing efforts there, there were over 50 Blastosaurus titles available, none of which still in their first printing.

In 2017 Richard moved to Los Angeles to pursue a career in comics outside of the tiny New Zealand market. Blastosaurus has been picked up by Golden Apple Books, restarting the series from scratch with his new collaborator Paul Eiding (known for his acting work in video games and television). The series will launch in March 2018 at WonderCon, then become a monthly series later in the year.

Selected works

 If I had an Elephant 
 That's Not the Monster We Ordered 
 My Grandpa is a Dinosaur (1960) 
 Gorillas in Our Midst 
 Morgan, the Moreporks, and the Moon
 Morgan Goes to Nowhere
 Morgan Goes to Sleep

Awards
Storylines Notable Book award, 2017

References

External links
 

1985 births
Living people
21st-century male writers